Parsonsia velutina, the  hairy silkpod, is a woody vine of the family Apocynaceae. It occurs in monsoon forest in New Guinea and across northern and eastern Australia, from The Kimberley, across the Top End to Cape York and south to central New South Wales.

Description
The stems may produce a watery sap when damaged. The broad, opposite leaves are clothed in brown hairs, giving rise to the common name.

Small, yellow and brown flowers are followed by long, slender pods which are 7 to 10 centimetres in length.

References

velutina
Gentianales of Australia
Flora of New South Wales
Flora of Queensland
Taxa named by Robert Brown (botanist, born 1773)